Settur is a village in Anantapur district of the Indian state of Andhra Pradesh. It is the headquarters of Settur mandal in Kalyandurg revenue division.

Geography 
It has an average elevation of 551 metres (1811 ft).

Demographics 
According to Indian census, 2001, the demographic details of Settur mandal is as follows:
 Total Population: 	38,281	in 7,564 Households.
 Male Population: 	19,493	and Female Population: 	18,788
 Children Under 6-years of age: 5,920	(Boys -	3,032 and Girls -	2,888)
 Total Literates: 	16,538

Panchayats 
The following is the list of village panchayats in Settur mandal.

References 

Villages in Anantapur district
Mandal headquarters in Anantapur district